Santiago Rodríguez Ramiro (born 27 July 1968 in Málaga), professionally known as Santi Rodríguez, in a Spanish actor and comedian.

Biography
He was born in Málaga, but after a month his family went to Jaén. He studied laws in the University of Granada, but he loved the comedia and the interpretation.

He achieved fame when he participated in El club de la comedia and was hired to participate in the TV serie 7 vidas (where he interpreted El Frutero, the fruiterer). Also he collabored in the late night La Noche con Manel Fuentes y Compañía.

He starred in some theatre plays with the producer Globomedia (e.g. 5hombres.com).

He was sworn in the eighth edition of the TV program ¡Más que baile!'' (Telecinco).

He is collaborator an ambassador for the Down Syndrome Association of Jaen.

References

1968 births
Living people
Spanish male television actors
People from Málaga
University of Granada alumni
Spanish male stage actors
21st-century Spanish male actors